Pemba Bay is a very large bay on the Indian Ocean of northeastern Mozambique.

Geography
The Pemba Bay is east-facing and is located in the area of the city of Pemba. It is hemmed in largely by the Pemba peninsula which contains the city and is accessed through a relatively narrow channel.  The Lúrio River empties into the sea just to the south of Pemba Bay. It is a notorious location for the illegal trade of ivory. Operators such as Kakazini offer trips around the bay for about US$40 per person. Several hotels overlook Pemba Bay including Londo Lodge, which has "beach-facing villas overlooking the bay, a restaurant and a range of water sports".

References

External links

Bays of Mozambique
Cabo Delgado Province